The Tākaka River lies in the northwest of New Zealand's South Island. It runs north for 70 kilometres, entering Golden Bay near the town of Tākaka.

It was reported on 17 January 2007 that the Tākaka River is one of a growing number of South Island rivers to have a confirmed case of the invasive river weed didymo.

In July 2020, the name of the river was officially gazetted as Tākaka River by the New Zealand Geographic Board.

References

Rivers of the Tasman District
Abel Tasman National Park
Rivers of New Zealand
Golden Bay